Bela taprurensis is a species of sea snail, a marine gastropod mollusk in the family Mangeliidae.

Description
The length of the shell attains 7.5 mm, its diameter 2.5 mm.

(Original description) The buff, fusiform shell is narrowly oblong. It contains 7 whorls of which two in the protoconch. The whorls of the teleoconch are slightly convex and are covered with raised longitudinal ribs. The whole surface is equably covered with fine, faintly raised, rounded, spiral threads. The aperture measures about a third of the total length. It is open, and oblong, pointed above, scarcely contracted below, but truncated at the end of the broad open siphonal canal. The columella is hardly twisted. The outer lip is sharp.

Distribution
This species occurs in the Mediterranean Sea off Greece, Libya and Tunisia

References

Bibliography
 Gofas, S.; Le Renard, J.; Bouchet, P. (2001). Mollusca, in: Costello, M.J. et al. (Ed.) (2001). European register of marine species: a check-list of the marine species in Europe and a bibliography of guides to their identification. Collection Patrimoines Naturels, 50: pp. 180–213
 Mariottini P., Smriglio C., Di Giulio A. & Oliverio M. 2009. A new fossil conoidean from the Pliocene of Italy, with comments on the Bela menkhorsti complex (Gastropoda: Conidae). Journal of Conchology 40(1): 5-14 
 Repetto G., Orlando F. & Arduino G. (2005): Conchiglie del Mediterraneo, Amici del Museo "Federico Eusebio", Alba, Italy

External links
  Mariottini P., Di Giulio A., Smriglio C. & Oliverio M. (2015). Additional notes on the systematics and new records of East Atlantic species of the genus Sorgenfreispira Moroni, 1979 (Gastropoda Mangeliidae). Biodiversity Journal. 6(1): 431–440
 
  Tucker, J.K. 2004 Catalog of recent and fossil turrids (Mollusca: Gastropoda). Zootaxa 682:1–1295.

taprurensis